William Meares (14 December 1848 – 17 October 1923) was a New Zealand cricketer. He played two first-class matches for Otago between 1873 and 1877.

See also
 List of Otago representative cricketers

References

External links
 

1848 births
1923 deaths
New Zealand cricketers
Otago cricketers